Teri Byrne (born April 11, 1972) is a former member of WCW's Nitro Girls and is a former fitness competitor.

Career
Byrne entered herself in numerous fitness competitions, including the Ujena calendar swimwear contest and Miss Fiesta Bowl for the Arizona State Sun Devils.

Then, she met Kimberly Page and she joined WCW's original Nitro Girls as Fyre on July 14, 1997, and stayed with them until 1999. She then opened a website as a model but shut it down after a couple of years. She appeared in a non-nude Nitro Girls pictorial in the September 1998 issue of Penthouse, along with Melissa Bellin, Chae An, and Kimberly Page. After the demise of the Nitro Girls in 2000, she was a member of the pop music group Diversity 5 with some other former Nitro Girls.

Other media
In 2001 she was actively involved with the development of a comic book entitled "Stiletto" about a bounty hunter portrayed by Teri. The book, published by Gypsy Press Comics, was originally to be titled "Nytro", but Turner Broadcasting would not allow them to use anything associated with their WCW franchise.  Issue #1 of Stiletto formally debuted at the 2001 Wizard World Chicago convention on August 17, 2001.

Personal life
Byrne grew up in Atlanta and spent a lot of time in the stables in which her father raised Arabian horses. She devoted much of her time to speaking out against cruelty to animals and the inhumane treatment of greyhounds and saddlebred horses. Byrne later graduated from Arizona State University with Honors in Communication.

Byrne lives in Charlotte, North Carolina. For the last nine years, she has worked for the University of Phoenix: two years in Atlanta as Enrollment Manager, then three years in Augusta, Georgia as director of enrollment before becoming regional director of enrollment for the Southeast region.

Byrne still loves animals and enjoys spending time with her Belgian Draft Horse, a rescue. She believes very strongly in healthy living, and is a vegetarian and a yoga enthusiast. Teri still occasionally does personal appearances with the Nitro Girls.

See also
The Nitro Girls

References

External links
Online World Of Wrestling Profile

Professional wrestling dancers
Living people
Female models from Florida
American female dancers
American dancers
People from Pensacola, Florida
Arizona State University alumni
1972 births
21st-century American women